Brian Mullins (born 1978 in Birr, County Offaly) is an Irish sportsperson. He plays hurling with his local club Birr and was a member of the Offaly senior hurling team from 2005 to 2010.

Playing career

Club
Mullins plays his club hurling with his local club Birr.

Inter-county
Mullins first came to prominence on the inter-county scene with the Offaly in late 2002 as a sub but did regain his place until 2007 due to the retirement of Stephen Byrne. Mullins retired from Inter-county hurling on 18 November 2010.

References

Offaly inter-county hurlers
Birr hurlers
Living people
1978 births